2nd Independent Corps of Northwestern Military Region was formed on December 19, 1949 in Zhongwei, Ningxia.

The corps was formed from defected Republic of China Army 81st Corps, the unit of Ningxia Hui clique Ma Hongbin.

The corps was originally composed of 2 divisions, with a total of 4 infantry regiments and a cavalry regiment and 9414 personnel.

In December 1950 the corps was reorganized as 1st Independent Division of Ninxia Military District.

In 1953 the division was reorganized as 1st Agricultural Construction Division.

In 1956 the division was demobilized.

References 

Divisions of the People's Liberation Army
Military units and formations established in 1949
Military units and formations disestablished in 1956